Trigonidiinae is a subfamily of insects in the order Orthoptera, suborder Ensifera, based on the type genus Trigonidium. They are often referred to as sword-tail crickets, winged bush crickets or trigs.

Tribes and Genera 
The Orthoptera Species File lists:

Phylloscyrtini
Auth.: Chopard, 1968; distribution: Americas
 Cranistus Stål, 1861
 Phyllopalpus Uhler, 1864
 Phylloscyrtus Guérin-Méneville, 1844

Trigonidiini
Auth.: Saussure, 1874; Worldwide distribution (except Antarctica)

 Amusurgus Brunner von Wattenwyl, 1893
 Anacyrtoxipha Chopard, 1934 - monotypic A. albotibialis (La Baume, 1911) - E. Africa
 Anaxipha Saussure, 1874
 Anaxiphomorpha Gorochov, 1987
 Cyrtoxipha Brunner von Wattenwyl, 1873 - Americas
 Cyrtoxiphoides Chopard, 1951
 Dolichoxipha Chopard, 1951 - Australia
 Estrellina- monotypic E. rehni Hebard, 1933 
 Falcicula - monotypic F. hebardi Rehn, 1903
 Hebardinella - monotypic H. americana (Chopard, 1932)
 Homoeoxipha Saussure, 1874
 Hydropedeticus Miall & Gilson, 1902
 Jarmilaxipha Otte & Peck, 1998
 Laupala Otte, 1994
 Lobeda Walker, 1869
 Macroanaxipha Hebard, 1928
 Metioche Stål, 1877
 Metiochodes Chopard, 1932
 Natula Gorochov, 1987
 Nudilla Gorochov, 1988
 Prolaupala Otte, 1994
 Rhicnogryllus Chopard, 1925
 Sectus Ma & Pan, 2019
 Svistella Gorochov, 1987
 Symphyloxiphus Rehn, 1906 - S. America
 Trigonidium Rambur, 1838
 Trigonidomorpha Chopard, 1925
 Zarceomorpha - monotypic Z. abdita Gorochov, 1994
 Zarceus Bolívar, 1895
 Zudella Gorochov, 1988

Tribe incertae sedis
Anele Otte, Carvalho & Shaw, 2003
Fijixipha Otte & Cowper, 2007
Kadavuxipha Otte & Cowper, 2007
Levuxipha Otte & Cowper, 2007
Minutixipha Otte & Cowper, 2007
Myrmegryllus Fiebrig, 1907
Nanixipha Otte, Carvalho & Shaw, 2003
Nausorixipha Otte & Cowper, 2007
Savuxipha Otte & Cowper, 2007
Tavukixipha Otte & Cowper, 2007
Vanuaxipha Otte & Cowper, 2007
Veisarixipha Otte & Cowper, 2007
Vitixipha Otte & Cowper, 2007
Vudaxipha Otte & Cowper, 2007

Fossil genera
†Abanaxipha
†Grossoxipha
†Proanaxipha

References

External links
 
 

 
Crickets